The Ritson Manuscript (London, British Library, Add.5665) is a late fifteenth-century English choirbook, that is a major source for English carols. In addition to 44 carols, it includes three masses, 23 motets, several other sacred pieces, and secular works in English and French.

Along with the Pepys Manuscript it is much less elaborate than the Eton, Lambeth and Caius Choirbooks; it contains shorter and simpler pieces which appear to have been written for smaller and less able choirs.  Unlike the Pepys Manuscript, the Ritson Manuscript appears, upon internal evidence, to have been the product of at least five distinct hands. It was compiled over a long period, beginning early in the second half of the fifteenth century and ending in 1510, and appears to originate in the West Country. It was later owned by Joseph Ritson, who in 1795 gave it to the British Museum.

Among the composers represented in the book is Sir William Hawte.

See also
 List of Christmas carols

Modern studies
 C. Miller. A Fifteenth-Century Record of English Choir Repertory: B.M. Add.Ms.5665: a Transcription and Commentary. Dissertation, Yale, 1948.

References

HOASM.org

15th-century books
Renaissance music
English music
Christmas carol collections
Renaissance music manuscript sources